Violet Hermione Graham, Duchess of Montrose GBE (10 September 1854 – 21 November 1940) was a British philanthropist and anti-suffragist. Graham served as president of the Scottish branch of the Women's National Anti-Suffrage League. Her husband was Douglas Graham, 5th Duke of Montrose.

Early life and marriage 

Violet Graham was born in London in 1854, the daughter of Sir Frederick Graham, 3rd Baronet of Netherby and Jane Hermione St. Maur, daughter of Edward St. Maur, 12th Duke of Somerset. She married the 5th Duke of Montrose, a Scottish nobleman, in 1876. Together they lived at the Clan Graham's Buchanan Castle in Scotland.

The Duchess and her husband had five children:
James Graham, 6th Duke of Montrose (1878–1954)
Lady Helen Violet Graham (1879–1945)
Lady Hermione Emily Graham (1882–1978), who married Sir Donald Cameron, 25th Lochiel
Brigadier Lord Douglas Malise Graham (1883–1974)
Captain Lord Alastair Mungo Graham (1886–1976)

The Duchess was a canopy bearer for Queen Alexandra at the Queen's coronation. In 1911, she was one of four women who carried the canopy over Queen Mary at the latter's coronation.

Philanthropic work 
The Duchess held several leadership positions with philanthropic organizations, including serving as president of the Soldier's and Sailor's Families Association of Scotland beginning in 1900, vice-president of the Territorial Force Nursing Service in 1908, and president of Scottish Red Cross beginning in 1909. She was also involved in charitable efforts focused on children. She commissioned a home for underprivileged children built in Loch Lomond in 1891.

Anti-suffragist work 
The Women's National Anti-Suffrage League was founded in 1908, marking the beginning of organized opposition to women's suffrage in the United Kingdom. The Duchess of Montrose became the leader of the Scottish National Anti-Suffrage League in 1910 when it became a formal affiliate of the English organization and was a high-profile advocate for the cause. Writing in the Anti-Suffrage Review, the Duchess described the goal of the Scottish league as convincing women "of the danger to the State if votes were given to large numbers of inexperienced women." Graham spoke at the Women's National Anti-Suffrage League's Annual Council in July 1910. She was also member of Mary Ward's Local Government Advancement Committee in 1912.

Awards and recognition 
The Duchess of Montrose was granted an Honorary Doctor of Laws from the University of Glasgow in 1907. She was awarded the GBE in 1918, the second year of the order's existence, while serving as the president of the Scottish branch of the British Red Cross Society. A high society profile of the Duchess published in 1904 described her as "the uncrowned queen of Glasgow." Montrose Cape, in the Hudson Strait, is named after her.

References

External links 
Photograph of the Duchess of Montrose at the 1911 coronation of King George V
Photograph of the Duchess of Montrose at the National Portrait Gallery
Photograph of the Duchess of Montrose at the National Trust Collections
Profile of the Duchess in the June 1910 issue of the Anti-Suffrage Review

1854 births
1940 deaths
Anti-suffragists
Montrose
Daughters of baronets
Clan Graham
Dames Grand Cross of the Order of the British Empire
Wives of knights